Let It Be Me is the fourth studio album by the Australian singer Jason Donovan. It was released in November 2008, and was Donovan's first new studio album in 15 years. It reached no.28 in the UK.

The album is a collection of cover versions of classic songs from the 1950s and 1960s, with only the final track being an original. Brian Eno produced the bonus track "Nobody But Me".

Track listing 
 "Let It Be Me" (Gilbert Becaud/Pierre Delanoe)
 "It's All in the Game" (Charles Gates Dawes/Carl Sigman)
 "Smoke Gets in Your Eyes" (Otto Harbach/Jerome Kern)
 "Halfway to Paradise" (Gerry Goffin/Carole King)
 "Be My Baby" (Phil Spector/Jeff Barry/Ellie Greenwich)
 "Dream Lover" (Bobby Darin)
 "Sealed with a Kiss" (Peter Udell/Gary Geld)
 "Blue Velvet" (Bernie Wayne/Lee Morris)
 "Love Letters" (Edward Heyman/Victor Young)
 "Sea Of Love" (Philip Baptiste/George Khoury)
 "Love Hurts" (Boudleaux Bryant)
 "Rhythm of the Rain" (John Gummoe)
 "If I Only Had Time" (Michel Fugain/Pierre Delanoe/Jack Fishman)
 "Wondrous Place" (Jeff Lewis/Bill Giant)
 "Lonesome Town" (Baker Knight)
 "Dreamboats and Petticoats" (Jason Donovan/Tom Gilbert/Henry Preistman) (feat. Hank Marvin on guitar)
 "All the Words We Don't Say" (Jason Donovan/Ian Brown/Anna Krantz)

2008 albums
Covers albums
Jason Donovan albums